Carl Martin Reinthaler (13 October 1822 – 13 February 1896) was a German organist, conductor and composer.

Alternative spellings include Karl Martin Reinthaler and Carl Martin Rheinthaler.

Biography
Reinthaler was born in Erfurt. He received his first music education from August Gottfried Ritter, an organist at Magdeburg Cathedral. He studied theology, and then music with Adolf Bernhard Marx, studying from 1849 to 1852 in Paris and Rome with a royal scholarship.

He was associated with the Bremen Cathedral, of which he was director, chorus master of the Singakademie Bremen, and cathedral organist since 1857. A friend of Johannes Brahms, with whom he corresponded, he was responsible for the Bremen performance of A German Requiem. Reinthaler also conducted the premiere of the revised version of Max Bruch's first violin concerto in January 1868.

In later years, Reinthaler required a wheel chair, which limited his appearances in public musical scenes. He died in Bremen.

Works
Jephtha und seine Tochter. Oratorio in two parts
Das Käthchen von Heilbronn. Opera in four acts
Choral works:
Fünf Sprüche und ein Weihnachtslied op. 50. Bremen, Praeger & Meier
Eile, Gott, mich zu erretten (Psalm 70)
Frohlocket mit Händen, alle Völker (Psalm 47) op. 18, 2
Lobe den Herrn, meine Seele (Psalm 103) op.40
Lobet den Herrn, alle Heiden (Psalm 117)
Meine Seele verlanget und sehnet sich (Psalm 42)
Wenn der Herr die Gefangenen Zions (Psalm 126)
Symphony, in D (opus 12)

Recordings
 Das Käthchen von Heilbronn. Richard Carlucci, Ilia Papandreou, Peter Schöne, Mate Solyom-Nagy, Marisca Mulder, Erfurt PO, Samuel Bächli cpo 2012
 Jephta und seine Tochter. Sabine Ritterbusch, Konstanze Maxsein, Waltraud Hoffmann-Mucher, Jürgen Sacher, Richard Salter, Oliver Zwarg, Bremer Domchor, Kammer Sinfonie Bremen, Wolfgang Helbich cpo 1997

References

Sources
 Carl Martin Reinthaler, in particular  this version
 Andreas Moser (ed.) Johannes Brahms Briefwechsel, zweiter Band, vol. vi, Berlin, 1912, 
Oliver Schwarz-Roosmann: Carl Martin Reinthaler - Lebensweg eines Bremer Musikdirektors.  Verlag Lit, Münster, Hamburg, London 2003,

External links
 
 
Information about Reinthaler
About Brahms, see note 16.
Interesting bit about Ein deutsches Requiem

1822 births
1896 deaths
German Romantic composers
German opera composers
Male opera composers
German classical organists
German male organists
German conductors (music)
German male conductors (music)
19th-century classical composers
19th-century conductors (music)
German male classical composers
19th-century German composers
Male classical organists
19th-century organists